The 1934 Wyoming Cowboys football team was an American football team that represented the University of Wyoming in the Rocky Mountain Conference (RMC) during the 1934 college football season.  In their second season under head coach Willard Witte, the Cowboys compiled a 3–5 record (2–4 against RMC opponents), finished in eighth place out of 12 teams in the RMC, and were outscored by a total of 109 to 78.

Schedule

References

Wyoming
Wyoming Cowboys football seasons
Wyoming Cowboys football